Pappa di latte is an album by  Italian singer Mina, issued in 1995. This is a double album issued as "CD. 1" and "CD. 2 ".

The Album 
Mina’s previous album Canarino mannaro was said to be of a high standard of excellence,  however Pappa di latte was not well received.  
Pappa di latte reached the lowest position in the year-end rankings since Mina started singing. For this reason the album represented a break with the practice of the past 20 years in which Mina has consistently recorded a double album consisting of one disc of covers and one of unpublished material.

There have been a few positive reviews, however. Some speak of "hard sounds and manicured arrangements sought by the rich and good musicians, but too unbalanced" while other reviews were more scathing says Mina should retire.  This album was considered a moment of low creativity but some critics remarked that her vocal prowess saved some of the songs.

With all that being said, this is still a solid album by Mina and not all the tracks are forgettable. Mina becomes "exceptional" when she faces the Gershwin’s They Can't Take that Away from Me or on the sparkling swing of Chiedimi tutto  by Luttazzi and especially when she gives "one of those thrilling interpretations that leave a mark"   with the track Almeno tu nell'universo by the late Mia Martini.

Some album reviews found the medley composed of A Night in Tunisia / Penso positivo / Copacabana (At the Copa) "curious"   or "just to irritate [...] purists"., Notably the interweaving of The Captain of Her Heart and Every Breath You Take by the group Police by adding "small but essential artistic brushstrokes" creates pure vocal and musical class.

On this album, Mina duets with her daughter Benedetta Mazzini on the remake of  the track More Than Words by the group Extreme. Mina also duets with her son Massimiliano Pani on the track If I Fell by the Beatles blending their voices harmoniously.

Among the unusual selection of composers, the trio of songs written by Audio2 is interesting Naufragati and Metti uno zero 'wallow between dance and rock without much conviction, while Non c'è più audio according to a review was "decent but nothing more".

Massimiliano Pani is credited to writing two beautiful love songs Se finisse tutto così and Torno venerdì. These are included among the unpublished tracks, but they have actually been recorded by Pani. Se finisse tutto così is from his album  Storie per cani sciolti  released with the original title  Valentina without you and Torno venerdì is from his debut album L'occasione.

The track Timida has a delicious bossanova rhythm and as a review put it "between Elvis and flavors of Brazil". The other track is Di vista which creates a dark and rarefied atmosphere. The "dark and deformed"  Donna donna donna written by, amongst others Cocciante and arranged by Christian Cappellutti is a "dramatic song with very low tones".

Track listing

CD. 1

CD. 2

Other versions 
If I fell:
 Live version on Television in 1965 on the live album Signori... Mina! vol. 4

Musicians

Artist
 Mina– voice

Arrangements 
 Christian Cappelluti – track 4 (CD 2)
 Gabriele Comeglio – tracks 1, 3, 7 (CD 1); 6 (CD 2)
 Massimiliano Pani – tracks 5, 6, 8/10 (CD 1); 1/3, 5, 8/11 (CD 2)
 Mauro Santoro – track 7 (CD2)

Other Artists 
 Christian Cappelluti, Massimiliano Pani, Mauro Santoro – keyboard
 Danilo Rea – piano, Fender
 Massimo Moriconi – electric bass, fretless, contrabass
 Riccardo Fioravanti – electric bass
 Christian Cappelluti, Sergio Farina, Paolo Gianolio, Massimo Varini – guitar
 Maurizio Dei Lazzaretti, Alfredo Golino, Christian Meyer – Drums
 Armando Armando, Candelo Cabezas – percussion
 Maurizio Giammarco, Michael Rosen – saxophone
 Franco Ambrosetti – trumpet
 Jazz Class Orchestra – tracks 1, 3, 7 (CD1); traccia 6 (CD 2)
 Benedetta Mazzini – featured on the track "More Than Words"
 Massimiliano Pani –  featured on the track "If I Fell"
 Audio2 –  featured on the track "Naufragati"
 Filippo Trojani –  featured on the track "Per te che mi hai chiesto una canzone"
 Emanuela Cortesi, Massimiliano Pani, Simonetta Robbiani – choir

Classification

References

1990 albums
Mina (Italian singer) albums